Traktor Chelyabinsk, also known as  Traktor, is a professional ice hockey team based in Chelyabinsk, Russia. They are members of the Kharlamov Division of the Eastern Conference of the Kontinental Hockey League (KHL).  From 1967 to 2009 the team played their home games at the Yunost Sport Palace. In 2009 the team moved to the arena now called Traktor Ice Arena named after Valery Belousov, their present home arena in Chelyabinsk.

History

Soviet Championship (1948–1992)
Founded in 1947 as a team of the Chelyabinsk Tractor Plant, Traktor have played for the Soviet and Russian championships since 1948. In 1948-1953 the team was called Dzerzhinets and Avangard in 1954 - 1958. The current name was adopted starting with the 1958–59 season.

Traktor played its first game in the top league on December 12, 1948 against CDKA Moscow. Viktor Shuvalov, a future star of Moscow clubs VVS and CSKA, led the team in scores during its first season in the championship. In 1955 Chelyabinsk reached the fourth place for the first time (back then a medal table still was dominated by the Moscow teams).

In 1965 - 1968, Traktor played in the second division of the Soviet hockey championships. The team returned to the first division in 1968. In 1973, Traktor played in the USSR Cup finals against the CSKA. Although Traktor led 2-0, they lost the game with a score of 2-5. In the 1976-77 season Traktor won bronze in the Soviet hockey championships, the team's highest achievement during the Soviet period of its history.

At that time, Traktor produced several players who achieved international prominence. One of the best Soviet forwards of all times, Sergei Makarov, was born in Chelyabinsk and began his career in Traktor. Along his teammate, defenseman Sergei Starikov, he regularly played on the Soviet national team from the late 1970s to the mid-1980s. Starikov and Makarov each won over 10 international tournaments with Team USSR.

International League and Russian Superleague years (1992–2008)
In the early 1990s, Traktor twice finished third in the International Hockey League  under head coach Valery Belousov. A group of Traktor players, including Sergei Gomolyako, Valeri Karpov, Igor Varitsky, Ravil Gusmanov and others, appeared on Team Russia at several world championships.

During the late 1990s ice hockey in Chelyabinsk entered a period of decline. In 1998 Traktor was relegated to the Vysshaya Liga and was replaced in its role as the major hockey team of Chelyabinsk by Mechel. The team found its way back to the elite only in 2006. Coached by Gennady Tsygurov they won the second division championship earning promotion to the Russian Superleague.

After the 2006-07 season, Tsygurov resigned. He was replaced by Andrei Nazarov, a native of Chelyabinsk who had spent 13 seasons in the NHL as an enforcer. Although he succeeded at securing Traktor's place in the top league, Nazarov's coaching style led Traktor to a new world record in overall penalty minutes in a single game that was set after the mass brawl versus Ak Bars Kazan in January 2008.

First seasons in the KHL (2008–2010)
During 2008–09 KHL season Traktor was reinforced by its alumni Ravil Gusmanov and NHL star Oleg Kvasha. Despite a good start Chelyabinsk finished the regular season with disappointing results and eventually failed to advance in the playoffs further than the first round losing the series to Atlant Moscow Oblast with an overall score 13-2. Kvasha was named the team's MVP of the season. 2009 was also notable for the club's move to the Arena Traktor. The first game in the new arena, played against Metallurg Magnitogorsk, was won by 3-2. The first player to score a goal was defenceman Andre Lakos.

Before the 2009–10 season the team had to face budget cuts and lose its biggest stars including Oleg Kvasha and Evgenii Dadonov. After an unstable performance in the regular season the team advanced to the playoffs with the lowest seed ultimately losing to its natural rival Metallurg Magnitogorsk in the first round.

Return of Belousov (2010–present)
During the 2010 off-season Nazarov left to coach infamous Vityaz Chekhov and was replaced by Andrei Sidorenko who was fired off his job right after the disastrous start of the season. In October 2010 Valery Belousov returned as Traktor's head coach, but, nonetheless, during the 2010–11 the team failed to make the playoffs.

After the lackluster season the team finally fixing its financial issues seriously rearranged the roster with future stars such as Vladimir Antipov, Stanislav Chistov, Jan Bulis, Petri Kontiola and goaltender Michael Garnett. The results were immediate, Traktor became the best team of the 2011–12 regular season winning Continental Cup and taking bronze medals after losing to Avangard Omsk in Eastern Conference Finals. The biggest breakthrough of the season was a young winger Evgeny Kuznetsov who led the team in points. Another homegrown Chelyabinsk player, Konstantin Panov, who returned to Traktor after five seasons of absence, became the team's goal scoring leader.

Traktor kept all of its leaders for the 2012–13 season. Unlike many other clubs in the league Chelyabinsk did not sign any NHL players who were returning to Europe during the NHL lockout. Facing much stronger competition this time Traktor finished the regular season in the third place of the Eastern Conference. Kuznetsov continued his successful career leading the team in points, goals and assists. 17 years old forward Valeri Nichushkin became that season's major breakthrough for Chelyabinsk, later in 2013 he won the Cherepanov Trophy as the KHL's Rookie of the Year and was picked in the top 10 of the NHL Entry Draft by the Dallas Stars.

On its way to the Gagarin Cup Finals Traktor had to endure three seven game series against Barys Astana, Avangard Omsk and Ak Bars Kazan, all three of those rounds were won back by the team from the position of 3-1 down in the series. One of the main components of the success was goaltender Michael Garnett who had 5 shutouts during the post-season and GAA of 1.86. However, the team was less fortunate in the final games played versus the defending champions Dynamo Moscow. Failing to take the lead in the series Traktor ultimately lost it 4-2.

Season-by-season KHL record

Note: GP = Games played, W = Wins, L = Losses, OTW = Overtime/shootout wins, OTL = Overtime/shootout losses, Pts = Points, GF = Goals for, GA = Goals against

Players

Current roster

Head coaches

 Viktor Vasiliev, 1948–52
 Vasily Karelin, 1952–54
 Sergei Zakhvatov, 1954–62
 Nikolai Sidorenko, 1962–64
 Aleksandr Novokreshchenov, 1964
 Viktor Stolyarov, 1964–65
 Vladislav Smirnov, 1965
 Albert Danilov, 1965–66
 Viktor Stolyarov, 1968–73
 Albert Danilov, 1973–74
 Anatoly Kostryukov, 1974–78
 Gennadi Tsygurov, 1978–84
 Anatoly Shustov, 1984–87
 Gennadi Tsygurov, 1987–90
 Valery Belousov, 1990–95
 Anatoly Kartaev, 1995
 Sergei Grigorkin, 1995–99
 Anatoly Timofeev, 2000–01
 Sergei Paramonov, 2001
 Aleksandr Glazkov, 2001–02
 Nikolai Makarov, 2002–03
 Anatoly Timofeev, 2003–05
 Anatoly Bogdanov, 2005
 Gennadi Tsygurov, 2005–07
 Andrei Nazarov, 2007–10
 Andrei Sidorenko, April 2010 - October 2010
 Valery Belousov, 2010–2014
 Karri Kivi, May 2014 - October 2014
 Andrei Nikolishin, October 2014 – November 2015
 Anvar Gatiyatulin, November 2015 – April 2018
 German Titov, June 2018 – October 2018
 Alexei Tertyshny, October 2018 – April 2019
 Pēteris Skudra, April 2019 – November 2019
 Vladimir Yurzinov, November 2019 – April 2020
 Anvar Gatiyatulin, April 2020 –

Honored members
Traktor Chelyabinsk hangs on the rafters of the Traktor Arena jerseys of all the Traktor players who have ever won the World Championship title, including the players who are currently active.

Franchise records and leaders

All-time KHL scoring leaders

These are the top-ten point-scorers in franchise history. Figures are updated after each completed KHL regular season.

Note: Pos = Position; GP = Games played; G = Goals; A = Assists; Pts = Points; P/G = Points per game  = current Traktor player

Honors

Champions
 KHL Continental Cup (1): 2012
 Vysshaya Liga Championship (1): 2006

Runners-up
 Gagarin Cup (1): 2013 Gagarin Cup (3): 2012, 2018, 2022 USSR Cup (1): 1973 Soviet League Championship: 1977 IHL Championship (2): 1993, 1994 Spengler Cup (1): 1973

References

External links
  

 
Ice hockey teams in Russia
Sport in Chelyabinsk
Kontinental Hockey League teams
Ice hockey clubs established in 1947
1947 establishments in Russia